Jens Kjell Otterbech (born 2 September 1933) was a Norwegian diplomat.

He was born in Hisøy, and graduated with the siv.øk. degree in business administration. He started working for the Norwegian Ministry of Foreign Affairs in 1961. In 1981 he became deputy under-secretary of state, and from 1984 he was an adviser in trace policy.

In 1986 Otterbech got his first ambassadorial post in Singapore. When the Norwegian Nobel Committee awarded the Nobel Peace Prize to Aung San Suu Kyi in 1991, Otterbech was tasked with requesting a travel permission from the Burmese government. Otterbech was denied entry to Burma.

Otterbech was then named as the first Norwegian ambassador to South Africa, as diplomatic ties were created in light of de-apartheidization. He assumed office in 1992. He received side accreditations to Lesotho and Swaziland. Lastly, from 1996 to 2000 he was the ambassador to Vietnam, also being accredited to Laos.

He resided at Stabekk.

References

1933 births
Living people
People from Arendal
Norwegian civil servants
Ambassadors of Norway to Singapore
Ambassadors of Norway to South Africa
Ambassadors of Norway to Lesotho
Ambassadors of Norway to Eswatini
Ambassadors of Norway to Vietnam
Ambassadors of Norway to Laos